The Ministry of Telecommunications is the government ministry responsible for telecommunications in Lebanon.

Ministers

 Rafiq Hariri, 1996–1998
Issam Naaman, 1998–2000
Jean-Louis Cardahi, 2000–2005
Alain Tabourian, 2005
Marwan Hamadé, 2005–2008
Gebran Bassil, 2008–2009
Charbel Nahas, 2009–2011
Nicolas Sehnaoui, 2011–2020
Talal Hawat, 2020–present

References

External links
 Ministry of Telecommunications website

Telecommunications
Lebanon, Telecommunications